Lee Yeon-ju (이연주) or Ri Yon-ju (리연주) may refer to:
Lee Yeon-ju (speed skater) (born 1964), South Korean speed skater
Lee Yeon-ju (volleyball) (born 1990), South Korean volleyball player